Hand in Hand is a Ugandan soap opera created to promote vocational training and the field of craftsmanship in the country. The first series was launched in October 2005 and ran until December of the same year. The show was produced by Great Lakes Film Production with funding from the Ugandan Ministry of Education and Sports and the German State Development Bank (Kreditanstalt für die Wiederaufbau). Other sponsors include Coca-Cola, Uganda Telecom and the German Technical Cooperation (GTZ).

The show is performed by an ensemble cast made up of exclusively Ugandan actors. Central themes include vocational training, women's rights/sexism, alcoholism and HIV/AIDS.

The show is ground-breaking in that it addresses these issues, but also in the fact that it uses the medium of film and television to present them, when film and media are not yet a key aspect of Ugandan culture. Ellen Görlich, the show's producer and head of Great Lakes Film Production, has been working in recent years to make the medium more well known in Uganda.

Cast and characters

External links
Hand in Hand Official Website
Great Lakes Film Production
Hand in Hand Theme Song
KfW (German State Development Bank)
German Technical Co-operation Website
Ugandan Ministry of Sport and Education
Uganda Telecom

See also
Beneath The Lies - The Series

References

Adult education television series
2010s television soap operas
2005 Ugandan television series debuts
2005 Ugandan television series endings
Ugandan drama television series
HIV/AIDS in television